We Must Obey is an album by the southern California stoner rock band Fu Manchu. It was released on February 19, 2007, and features a cover of the Cars' "Moving in Stereo."

Track listing

Personnel
Scott Hill – vocals, guitar
Bob Balch – guitar
Brad Davis – bass, theremin
Scott Reeder – drums

Production
Andrew Alekel – producer
Fu Manchu – producer

References

Fu Manchu (band) albums
Century Media Records albums